Hawa Baghdad is an Iraqi television show produced by Al Sharqiya.

The show starred Eser West and Zahra Habib, and was written and directed by Muhaned Abu Khumra. It first aired on Al Sharqiya on May 6, 2019.

All of the songs were by the singers Aseel Hamim, Nasrat El-Badr, and Hussein Ghazal.

Cast 

Eser West
Zahraa Habib
Sami Qoftan
A’awatef El-Salman
Angham El-Rabeey
Kazem El-Qorashyy
Saad Khalifa
Mohamed Nasser

Production 
All of the episodes had been shot in Baghdad in April–May 2019.

All of the episodes were shot by ُEl-Badr cultural and art institution crews with the assistance of Turkish videographers.

Theme song 
Song Name: Hawa Baghdad

Singers: Nassrat El-Badr

Lyrics: Diaa El-Mayaly

Compositing: Nassrat El-Badr

Music Distribution: Hossam El-Dien

Studios: Nassrat El-Badr Studios

Songs

Awards and nominations

References 

Arabic-language television shows
Iraqi television shows